Aleksandr Yevgenyevich Lomovitsky (born 27 January 1998) is a Russian football player who plays for FC Rubin Kazan. He is a winger who can play on the right or left side.

Club career
He made his debut in the Russian Football National League for FC Spartak-2 Moscow on 8 July 2017 in a game against FC Sibir Novosibirsk.

He made his debut in the Russian Premier League for FC Spartak Moscow on 28 July 2018 in a game against FC Orenburg.

On 26 July 2019, he joined FC Arsenal Tula on loan for the 2019–20 season.

On 12 August 2020, he moved on loan to FC Khimki for the 2020–21 season. On 1 October 2020, he was recalled from the Khimki loan and re-joined FC Arsenal Tula on another loan.

On 29 December 2021, he signed a 4.5-year contract with FC Rubin Kazan. On 14 July 2022, Lomovitsky returned on loan to FC Khimki.

International
He was included in the Russia national under-17 football team for the 2015 UEFA European Under-17 Championship and 2015 FIFA U-17 World Cup.

Career statistics

References

External links
 
 
 
 Profile by Russian Football National League

1998 births
Footballers from Moscow
Living people
Russian footballers
Russia youth international footballers
Russia under-21 international footballers
Association football midfielders
FC Spartak-2 Moscow players
FC Spartak Moscow players
FC Arsenal Tula players
FC Khimki players
FC Rubin Kazan players
Russian Premier League players
Russian First League players